Gordonia curtyana is a species of plant in the family Theaceae. It is endemic to Cuba.  It is threatened by habitat loss.

References

Endemic flora of Cuba
curtyana
Critically endangered plants
Taxonomy articles created by Polbot
Taxobox binomials not recognized by IUCN